Wang Jue (born 17 October 1995 in Beijing) is a Chinese chess player, who holds the FIDE title of Woman Grandmaster.

She won the World Under-10 girls championship in 2005. In 2010 Wang was a member of the Chinese team (along with Yu Yangyi, Lu Shanglei and Wang Chen) which won the 5th Vladimir Dvorkovich Cup, a junior team competition held in Moscow.

She finished third in the Women's Chinese Chess Championship of 2011.

Wang Jue tied for first with Zhao Xue and Tan Zhongyi in the Asian Women's Blitz Championship of 2012, placing second on tiebreak. She won it in 2013 with a perfect score of 9/9. In 2015, she tied for first again in the same event, taking the bronze on tiebreak.

Wang competed in the Women's World Chess Championship 2015 losing in the first round to French Grandmaster Marie Sebag and thus being eliminated from the tournament.

References

External links 

Wang Jue chess games at 365Chess.com

1995 births
Living people
Chess woman grandmasters
Chinese female chess players
World Youth Chess Champions
Chess players from Beijing